The 2007 Osun State gubernatorial election was the 4th gubernatorial election of Osun State. Held on 14 April 2007, the People's Democratic Party nominee Olagunsoye Oyinlola won the election, defeating Rauf Aregbesola of the Action Congress of Nigeria.

Results 
Olagunsoye Oyinlola from the People's Democratic Party won the election, defeating Rauf Aregbesola from the Action Congress of Nigeria. Registered voters was 1,297,297.

References 

Osun State gubernatorial elections
Osun gubernatorial
April 2007 events in Nigeria